Time Will Tell is the second album by American heavy metal band Fifth Angel, released in 1989. It was produced by Terry Brown, and was Fifth Angel's last full-length studio album for 29 years, until the release of The Third Secret in 2018.

Track listing

Personnel
 Ted Pilot – lead vocals
 Kendall Bechtel – lead guitar
 Ed Archer – rhythm guitar, keyboards
 John Macko – bass, keyboards
 Ken Mary – drums

Additional musicians
 Carol Howell – keyboards programming
 Scott Humphrey – keyboards programming
 Lisa Dal Bello – backing vocals on tracks 4 and 10

Production
 Terry Brown – producer
 Mixed at Metalworks Studios 
 Noel Golden – engineer, mixing 
 Artie Smith – drum technician
 Stephen Byram – art direction
 Amy Guip – illustration
 Derek Simon – management

References

1989 albums
CBS Records albums
Fifth Angel albums